Pomaria jamesii (common name James' holdback), is a plant found in the American southwest.

Uses
The Zuni people give an  infusion  to sheep to make them "prolific".

References

Caesalpinieae
Flora of the Southwestern United States
Plants used in traditional Native American medicine